Lioprosopa rhodosticha is a species of snout moth in the genus Lioprosopa. It was described by Turner in 1904, and is known from Australia.

References

Moths described in 1904
Anerastiini